Ann Jansson may refer to:

Ann Jansson (racewalker)
Ann Jansson (footballer)

See also
 Anna Jansson